Babar Khan Ghauri (born September 16, 1961) is a Pakistani politician from Karachi, Sindh, Pakistan.  He also served as Minister for Ports and Shipping Pakistan in former Prime Ministers of Pakistan Yousaf Raza Gillani and Shaukat Aziz's tenure. He  also served as member of Senate of Pakistan till 2015. As main source of income, he runs a Real Estate Business in Karachi and Dubai. He is a former senior political leader of Muttahida Qaumi Movement (MQM).

References

Living people
Muhajir people
Muttahida Qaumi Movement politicians
National Defence University, Pakistan alumni
Politicians from Karachi
Members of the Senate of Pakistan
1961 births